King's College Hospital is a major teaching hospital and major trauma centre in Denmark Hill, Camberwell in the London Borough of Lambeth, referred to locally and by staff simply as "King's" or abbreviated internally to "KCH". It is managed by King's College Hospital NHS Foundation Trust. It serves an inner city population of 700,000 in the London boroughs of Southwark and Lambeth, but also serves as a tertiary referral centre in certain specialties to millions of people in southern England.  It is a large teaching hospital and is, with Guy's Hospital and St. Thomas' Hospital, the location of King's College London School of Medicine and one of the institutions that comprise the King's Health Partners, an academic health science centre. The chief executive is Dr Clive Kay. It is also the birthplace of Camilla, Queen Consort.

History

Early history

King's was originally opened in 1840 in the disused St Clement Danes workhouse in Portugal Street close to Lincoln's Inn Fields and King's College London itself. It was used as a training facility where medical students of King's College could practice and receive instruction from the college's own professors. The surrounding area there was composed of overcrowded slums characterised by poverty and disease. Within two years of opening, the hospital was treating 1,290 inpatients in 120 beds, with two patients sharing a bed by no means unusual. The main contractor for the new hospital was Lucas Brothers. It was one of the first hospitals to start nurse training, in 1856.

Pioneer of aseptic surgery Joseph Lister performed the first major elective surgery under strict antiseptic conditions in 1877. He helped propel the hospital to have a surgical unit comparable with the best in Europe.

In the first years of the 20th century, demographic changes saw a decrease in the number of patients requiring treatment in the centre of London, and an increase of patients from further afield – notably Camberwell, Peckham and Brixton which were then suburbs on the outskirts of London. Following an Act of Parliament in 1904, a foundation stone was laid for the new hospital, designed by William Pite, in 1909 at its present site at Denmark Hill, south of the River Thames. The move to Denmark Hill provided the hospital with a greenfield-site nearer to its patients. The building itself incorporated modern design principles to encourage adequate ventilation, used electric clocks throughout, contained only the second internal phone installation in the UK at the time, and generated its own power through the use of diesel engines.

Pre-clinical training of medical students remained the responsibility of King's College London, whilst advanced medical training took place at the hospital under the auspices of a newly formed King's College Hospital Medical School. 
During the First World War, a large part of the hospital was requisitioned by the War Office to create the 4th London General Hospital, a facility for the Royal Army Medical Corps to treat military casualties. A dental school was established at the same site in 1923. During this time most patients were still poor and highly vulnerable to contagious diseases such as tuberculosis. In 1937 the private Guthrie wing was established with a donation from the Stock Exchange Dramatic and Operatic Society for wealthier patients to enjoy less crowded wards. During the Second World War the hospital was used for treating casualties of air raids, and was fortunate never to sustain a major direct hit. The hospital was the birthplace of Camilla, Queen Consort in 1947.

Modern history

Following the creation of the National Health Service in 1948, the hospital was granted Teaching Hospital status. In 1974 the NHS re-organisation saw King's become the centre for all health services management in its catchment area. The hospital's medical school was reunited with King's College in 1983 to form King's College School of Medicine and Dentistry. A purpose-built medical education centre, the Weston Education Centre, was built in 1997 and contains a medical library as well as hosting conferences, symposia, and professional training events as well as containing public access computer rooms for students. In 1998 King's College School of Medicine and Dentistry merged with the United Medical and Dental Schools (UMDS) of Guy's and St Thomas's Hospitals to form Guy's, King's and St Thomas's School of Medicine, commonly abbreviated to "GKT".

The Golden Jubilee wing, intended to host a number of outpatient clinics as well as therapy suites for speech and language, occupational therapy and physiotherapy, was procured under a Private Finance Initiative contract in 2000. The works, which were carried by a joint venture of Costain and Skanska at a cost of £50 million, were completed in 2002.

In December 2013 it was announced that a proposed merger with Guy's and St Thomas' and South London and Maudsley NHS Foundation Trusts had been suspended because of doubts about the reaction of the Competition Commission.

The Trust took over the management of Princess Royal University Hospital in October 2013 after the dissolution of the South London Healthcare NHS Trust.  Over Christmas 2013 8 patients there waited on trolleys for more than 12 hours for admission, the largest number of trolley waits in England.

Facilities
The hospital is situated mainly on Bessemer Road, which is completely contained within the hospital grounds. Although the classically-styled Hambleden Wing Entrance is still the official main entrance, the Golden Jubilee Wing Entrance about 100m to the north-east has become the de facto main entrance, due to it being directly opposite Caldecot Road (where pedestrians arrive from the Coldharbour Lane bus stops) and having the ambulance parking spaces in front of it. There is also the new walk-in A&E Entrance on Bessemer Road (previously located on Denmark Hill), next to the Golden Jubilee Wing and the Denmark Wing entrance and Ambulance Admissions on Denmark Hill (there is no unaccompanied patient access between A&E and the rest of the hospital), whilst on Bessemer Road is the Bessemer Wing Entrance and there is also the Cheyne Wing Entrance on an unnamed service road at the south-west of the main building.

The Trust was one of the first such organisations to introduce a comprehensive public Wi-Fi service, which is free of charge courtesy of the Charitable Trust.

A new outpatient unit with 48 consulting rooms and eight procedure rooms was built in 2022, with Premier Modula using offsite construction methods on a very constrained site.

Location
On the opposite side of the A215 (Denmark Hill) is the Maudsley psychiatric hospital, which has close links with King's. The Institute of Psychiatry is nearby and many doctors at King's collaborate with their academic colleagues in carrying out research in conditions such as Parkinson's disease and Motor neurone disease. The Denmark Hill Campus of King's College London is also on Denmark Hill although the main Strand campus is further along the 68 bus route at Aldwych. The nearest railway station is Denmark Hill railway station.

Media
The hospital was featured in Channel 4's documentary 24 Hours in A&E from 11 May 2011 to 16 June 2014. The documentary focuses on the hospital's accident and emergency department and is filmed using 70 different cameras strategically placed to capture the workings of the department without interference.
It was also featured in Louis Theroux's 2016 documentary Drinking to Oblivion.

Notable alumni

 James W. Black – 1924–2010 Nobel Prize for Medicine winner 1988 for his contribution to discoveries of important principles for drug treatment
 William Bowman – 1837–1865 Ophthalmic surgeon, helped found Ophthalmological Society of the United Kingdom
 John Leonard Dawson – 1932–1999 Serjeant Surgeon to the Royal Household of the United Kingdom
 Reita Faria – Indian model and Miss World 1966
 William Fergusson – 1840–1877 Surgeon, introduced practice of conservative amputation
 David Ferrier – 1871–1908 Pioneering experimental neurologist
 Robert Daniel Lawrence, co-founder of Diabetes UK
 Henry Lee, surgeon, pathologist and syphilologist
 Joseph Lister – 1887–1893 Pioneer of antiseptic surgery
 Victor Negus – 1887–1974 Laryngologist and comparative anatomist
 Robert McCance (1898-1993) Effects of salt deficiency, iron regulation mechanism, The Chemical Composition of Foods, modern nutrition
 Dhani Ram Prem (1904–1979), the first Asian councillor of Birmingham and winner of Padma Shri
 Audrey Smith (1915–1981), cryobiologist
 Andy Williams – Knee and sports surgeon specialising in ligament injuries and known for treating Premier League footballers.

See also 
Healthcare in London
List of hospitals in England
King's Health Partners
List of NHS trusts
John Cutting (psychiatrist)
Guy's Hospital
Maudsley Hospital
St Thomas' Hospital
King's College London GKT School of Medical Education
Francis Crick Institute

References

External links

South London Press article: 'Campaigners delighted with plans for mental health area at King's'
 The history of King's College Hospital
 Official site of the National Health Service

1840 establishments in England
Health in the London Borough of Lambeth
Health in the London Borough of Southwark
Hospitals established in 1840
King's College London
NHS hospitals in London
Teaching hospitals in London
Camberwell